WASP-22b is an extrasolar planet orbiting the Sun-like star WASP-22  in the constellation Orion. This hot Jupiter has an orbit of 3.53 days and a mass of 0.617 MJ was detected by transit via SuperWASP. The system is a hierarchical triple system.

Naming
In 2019 the IAU announced as part of NameExoWorlds that WASP-22 and its planet WASP-22b would be given official names chosen by school children from Guatemala. The star WASP-22 is named Tojil. Tojil is the name of one of the Mayan deities related to rain, storms, and fire. The planet WASP-22b is named Koyopa'. Koyopa' is the word associated with lightning in K'iche' (Quiché) Mayan language.

Physical characteristics
The Rossiter-McLaughlin effect effect based study in 2011 have determined the planetary orbit is slightly misaligned to the rotational axis of the parent star, with reported angle 22 degrees.

References

Exoplanets discovered by WASP
Transiting exoplanets
Hot Jupiters
Exoplanets discovered in 2010
Exoplanets with proper names